Oshtorinan (oŝtorinān, Ashtarian, also Romanized as Oshtorīnān and Oshtornīān) is a town and the capital of Oshtorinan District, in Borujerd County, Lorestan Province, Iran. At the 2006 census, its population was 5,264, in 1,408 families. The city and district is populated by Kurds.

Oshtorinan has a cold climate and is an agricultural centre. Oshtorinan is located in the western region of Iran between the cities of Borujerd, Malayer, and Nahavand. It is 15 km north-west of Borujerd and historically has been used as a caravanserai for travelling from Borujerd to Hamedan, and from Isfahan to Baghdad.

References

Towns and villages in Borujerd County
Cities in Lorestan Province
Kurdish settlements in Iran